Odisha Sahitya Akademi Award  is a literary award awarded to an Odia language litterateur for outstanding contribution to Odia literature in various categories by the Odisha Sahitya Akademi, an institution established in 1957 in Odisha for active promotion of Odia language and literature.

Awards

1957 and 1958

1956, 1957 and 1958

1959, 1960 and 1961

1962, 1963 and 1964

1965, 1966 and 1967

1966, 1967 and 1968

1969, 1970, 1971, 1972 and 1973

1973, 1974 and 1975

1974, 1975 and 1976

1975, 1976 and 1977

1976, 1977 and 1978

1977, 1978 and 1979

1978, 1979 and 1980

1979, 1980 and 1981

1980, 1981 and 1982

1981, 1982 and 1983

1982, 1983 and 1984

1983, 1984 and 1985

1984, 1985 and 1986

1985, 1986 and 1987

1986, 1987 and 1988

1987, 1988 and 1989

1988, 1989 and 1990

1989, 1990 and 1991

1990, 1991 and 1992

1991, 1992 and 1993

1992, 1993 and 1994

1993, 1994 and 1995

1994, 1995 and 1996

1995, 1996 and 1997

1996, 1997 and 1998

1997, 1998 and 1998

1998, 1999 and 2000

1999, 2000 and 2001

2000, 2001 and 2002

See also
Sahitya Akademi Award
Jnanpith Award

References

External links
Orissa Sahitya Academy Award winners

Awards established in 1957
Indian literary awards
Odia-language literary awards